The 2020–21 Fordham Rams men's basketball team represented Fordham University during the 2020–21 NCAA Division I men's basketball season. The Rams, led by sixth-year head coach Jeff Neubauer, played their home games at Rose Hill Gymnasium in The Bronx, New York as a member of the Atlantic 10 Conference. They finished the season 2-12, 2-11 in A-10 Play to finish in last place. They lost in the first round of the A-10 tournament to George Washington.

Previous season
The Rams finished the 2019–20 season 9–22, 2–16 in A-10 play to finish in last place. They defeated George Washington in the first round of the Atlantic 10 tournament and were set to take on Duquesne in the second round before the remainder of the Atlantic 10 Tournament was cancelled amid the COVID-19 pandemic.

Departures

2020 recruiting class

Roster

Schedule and results

|-
!colspan=9 style=| Non-conference regular season

|-
!colspan=9 style=| Atlantic 10 regular season

|-
!colspan=9 style=| Atlantic 10 tournament

Source

See also
 2020–21 Fordham Rams women's basketball team

References

Fordham
Fordham Rams men's basketball seasons
Fordham
Fordham